The Făgăraș mountain group is a subgroup of mountains in the Southern Carpathians. It is named after the highest of the mountains in the group, the Făgăraș Mountains.

Boundaries
The Făgăraș group is bounded:
in the west, by the Olt River
in the east, by the Rucăr-Bran Passage and the river Dâmbovița

Mountains
Făgăraș Mountains (Munții Făgărașului)
Iezer Mountains (Munții Iezer; literally:Mountains of the Deep Lake)
Cozia Mountains (Munții Cozia)

See also
Carpathian Mountains
Parâng Mountains group
Bucegi Mountains

External links
 Pictures and images from the Fagaras Mountains group 
http://www.carpati.org/
http://www.alpinet.org/

Mountain ranges of Romania
Mountain ranges of the Southern Carpathians